The Ambetter Health 400 is a NASCAR Cup Series stock car race held at Atlanta Motor Speedway in Hampton, Georgia. Joey Logano is the defending race winner.

This race was originally Atlanta's second race of the season and was run as a late-season event for much of its history. From 1987 until 2001, the race was scheduled in November as the final race of the NASCAR season. From 2002 until 2008, the race was moved to October in favor of awarding the final race weekend to Homestead-Miami Speedway and became part of what is now the NASCAR Chase for the Championship in 2004. In 2009, Atlanta swapped fall race dates with Auto Club Speedway and the race was moved to Labor Day weekend. From 2011 onward, this has been Atlanta's only Cup Series race date as its spring race was moved to Kentucky Speedway and run later in the year.

In 2015, the race lost its place as the Labor Day weekend race for the Cup Series and became the second race of the season (after the season-opening Daytona 500). In 2020, it was moved from being the second race of the season to being the first race after the west coast swing (the races at Las Vegas, Phoenix and Fontana), making it the fifth race of the Cup Series season. However, the race would end up being run in June that year due to the COVID-19 pandemic (and it was the first Cup Series race to be postponed due to the pandemic). In 2021, the race was held as scheduled in March as the fifth race of the season.

History
From 1987 until 2001, the race was scheduled as the final race of the NASCAR season, and thus was typically the event in which the champion was decided. Several times, however, the championship had already been clinched prior to this race, rendering the race anticlimactic. In some cases, the championship would be decided the moment the points leader took the green flag to start the race – effectively clinching enough championship points by finishing last or better. Other times the championship might be decided early or mid-race, well before the checkered flag. For instance, in the 1993 race, Dale Earnhardt needed to finish 34th or better to mathematically clinch the championship. On lap 117 of 328, eight cars had dropped out of the race (including teammate Neil Bonnett in an intentional start and park). That meant Earnhardt could finish no worse than 34th and had effectively clinched the title before the race had reached the halfway point.

The 1992 race marked the final race for Richard Petty, and coincidentally, the debut for Jeff Gordon. With six drivers eligible for the Winston Cup Championship, the race is widely regarded as one of the greatest NASCAR races of all time. Alan Kulwicki, who finished second in the race, edged out Bill Elliott, the race winner, by leading one more lap in the race. Kulwicki won the NASCAR Winston Cup title by a then-record margin of only 10 points.

The 1998 race was run mostly at night after a long rain delay; despite the inexperience with the lights, newly installed for an Indy Racing League race, NASCAR and the teams agreed to attempt finishing the race at night.  It was shortened to 221 laps because it was after 11:00 p.m. EST and NASCAR wanted to "get the fans out at a decent hour". The 1999 Cracker Barrel 500 also ended at night. This would mark a springboard of sorts at finishing delayed races at night by utilizing a track's permanent lighting system.

In 2001, the race was scheduled as the season finale, however, it ended up being the second-to-last race. The New Hampshire 300 was postponed from September 16 to the Friday after Thanksgiving, due to 9/11. Beginning in 2002 the race was moved to mid-October as NASCAR elected to hold its final race at Homestead-Miami Speedway instead of Atlanta. The 2003 race started a tradition of night qualifying at Atlanta, which has carried over to the spring race as well.

In 2006, the race start time was changed from 12:40 pm. EDT to 2:55 pm. EDT to finish the race at night. Driver complaints erupted because of the track's troublesome situation where the sun can get into the driver's eyes in Turn 1, including leading to a crash during the time the sun sets in that area of the track between Jeff Gordon and Jamie McMurray, led to the abandonment of the 3 pm start after this race.

During the race's history as the second in Atlanta, it had been rumored to be either eliminated or moved several times in recent years. On February 29, 2008, it was reported that Bruton Smith, the president of the track's owner, Speedway Motorsports, was talking with International Speedway Corporation (the owner of numerous other NASCAR tracks) about a possible date switch for 2009 with one of its tracks. He proposed a move that involved the fall Atlanta race and the Pepsi 500, the Labor Day weekend race held at Auto Club Speedway. Doing so would give the Fontana, California track a race in the Chase for the Championship and also make the three races that precede the beginning of the Chase closer to each other geographically. Prior to the realignment, the teams raced in the Sharpie 500 at Bristol the week before Labor Day, then traveled cross country to California for the Pepsi 500, and then came back across the country to run the Chevy Rock & Roll 400 at Richmond the following Saturday. Smith's offer to have Atlanta as the Labor Day weekend race was accepted and was officially announced by NASCAR on August 19, 2008. However, instead of moving the race at Auto Club Speedway (previously on Labor Day weekend) to Atlanta's spot on the schedule at the end of October, the AMP Energy 500 at Talladega Superspeedway was moved to that spot after previously being at the beginning of October, and the aforementioned Pepsi 500 was moved to the beginning of October in Talladega's old spot.

In 2015, Atlanta's lone race date moved to the second week of the season in early March, with the Bojangles' Southern 500 at Darlington Raceway returning to its traditional Labor Day weekend date. Atlanta will be run on a Sunday afternoon. This event used to be called the Oral-B USA 500, and this event used to be aired on ESPN for 6 years preceding the Irwin Tools Night Race at Bristol Motor Speedway and the Federated Auto Parts 400 at Richmond International Raceway

On July 10, 2022, the track announced that Ambetter would be the title sponsor of the race starting in 2023. The company, owned by Centene Corporation, was the title sponsor of the Xfinity Series race at New Hampshire (another Speedway Motorsports-owned track) in 2021 and the Cup Series race at New Hampshire in 2022. QuikTrip, one of the two title sponsors of the race since 2015, announced prior to the 2022 race that it would be their last year as title sponsor. Folds of Honor, the other title sponsor of the race, also did not return in 2023 as their title sponsorship was as a result of a partnership they have with QuikTrip.

Race winners

Notes
1977 & 2002: Race shortened due to rain
1998: Race shortened due to approaching 11:00 p.m. curfew.
2000: Race postponed from Sunday to Monday due to rain.
2003: Race started on Sunday but was finished on Monday due to rain.
2007, 2012, 2014, & 2016: Race extended due to a NASCAR Overtime finish. 2014 took two attempts.
2011: Race delayed from Sunday night to Tuesday morning due to rain.
2020: Race postponed from March 15 to June 7 due to the COVID-19 pandemic.

Track length notes
1960–1969: 1.5-mile course
1970–1996: 1.522-mile course
1997–present: 1.54 mile course

Multiple winners (drivers)

Multiple winners (teams)

Manufacturer wins

Notable races

1966: Richard Petty led 90 laps and beat Buddy Baker for his first Atlanta win, but the story of the race centered on pole-sitter Curtis Turner and third-starting Fred Lorenzen.  With Ford's participation stopped in a dispute over engine rules, the season had been dominated by Chrysler race cars. Turner entered a Smokey Yunick Chevrolet rumored to be radically altered and not in compliance with the NASCAR rulebook; Lorenzen drove Junior Johnson's Ford, a car nicknamed "The Yellow Banana" because the body had been visibly altered; both cars passed NASCAR inspection where others did not.  Turner led 60 laps and finished 24th with distributor failure while Lorenzen led 24 laps and was eliminated in a crash, finishing 23rd.
1971: Richard Petty became the first stock car driver to reach $1 million in career earnings after a race-long duel with Bobby Allison.
1976: Dave Marcis took his final superspeedway win. Driving Harry Hyde's famous No. 71 Dodge, Marcis engaged in a nose-to-nose battle for most of the first 64 laps with Buddy Baker, Cale Yarborough, and David Pearson. Part-time racer Dale Earnhardt survived a huge crash with some 60 to go when Dick Brooks hit the wall in Three and slid into Earnhardt's path; Earnhardt tumbled to the fourth turn.
1977: The race shortened due to rain/darkness.  Darrell Waltrip took advantage of the lapped car of James Hylton to storm past Donnie Allison on the last lap; Allison crashed with Cale Yarborough coming to the stripe.
1978: A scoring breakdown led to an embarrassing change of the declared winner.  Manual scoring ruled that Richard Petty had edged Dave Marcis at the stripe, but a recheck hours later proved that Donnie Allison, who finished two lengths ahead of Petty and Marcis, had indeed won.
1979: Neil Bonnett edged Dale Earnhardt, Yarborough, and Bobby Allison in a hot four-car battle over the race's final 20 laps.  Following the race, Darrell Waltrip took a two-point lead over Richard Petty entering the season finale in Ontario.
1980: A multi-car wreck in the first 20 laps eliminated the Allison brothers and other contenders, leaving Cale Yarborough to breeze all but uncontested to the win; the win helped him close to within 29 points of leader Dale Earnhardt with one race left in the 1980 title chase.
1981: ESPN televised the race live, the first such telecast for the third-year cable network.  The race turned into a spirited affair as Neil Bonnett and Richard Petty fought back and forth for the lead amid bids by Darrell Waltrip, Joe Ruttman, and Harry Gant.  The final two laps were a fierce duel won by Bonnett over Waltrip and Cale Yarborough.
1982: The race set a track record for lead changes at 45, among 14 drivers.  Blistered tires ruined a victory bid by Richard Petty as Bobby Allison outdueled Darrell Waltrip and Harry Gant for the win. This would be the final start for Country music singer Marty Robbins, who would die in December of that year.
1984: Driver Terry Schoonover was killed in the race after crashing into the barrier in turn two.
1986: Dale Earnhardt wrapped up his second career title by completely dominating the Dixie 500.  The rest of the top five was a list of NASCAR luminaries – Richard Petty, Bill Elliott, Tim Richmond, and Buddy Baker.
1987: For the first time, this race was scheduled as the final race of the NASCAR season.
1989: In this race, independent driver Grant Adcox was killed in a crash.
1990: With cars packed tightly together for late-race pit stops under yellow (the result of NASCAR's rule closing pit road when the yellow comes out instead of letting cars pit before taking the yellow), one of Bill Elliott's crew members was killed when Ricky Rudd was coming into the pits for service and lost control of his car. This led to NASCAR mandating a speed limit on pit road for crew member's safety.
1992: Widely considered one of the most dramatic NASCAR races of all time. See 1992 Hooters 500
1993: Race winner Rusty Wallace and Winston Cup champion Dale Earnhardt circled the track in a Polish Victory Lap, carrying No. 7 and No. 28 flags to honor Alan Kulwicki and Davey Allison who were both killed in aviation accidents during the season. Both Kulwicki and Allison were key fixtures exactly one year earlier at the classic 1992 race.
1995: Jeff Gordon wrapped up his first series title as Dale Earnhardt drove his No. 3 to victory at the race time of 3 hours, 3 minutes, and 3 seconds.
1996: Bobby Labonte took the win, the first for Joe Gibbs Racing building its own engines after four seasons running Rick Hendrick engines.  Terry Labonte clinched the 1996 Winston Cup Championship driving for Hendrick Motorsports. The two made a victory lap together and celebrated together in victory lane.
1997: 325 laps / 500.5 miles with new configuration.  Bobby Labonte won in JGR's first win with Pontiac; Pontiacs dominated the top ten at the finish
1998: Race shortened due to rain and darkness. Rain delays throughout the day made the race go into midnight, and track officials wanted the fans to get home at a decent hour. First night Cup race.
2000: Race postponed from Sunday to Monday due to rain. Final career start's for Darrell Waltrip. It would be the final time the event would be the last race of the NASCAR season.
2001: Was scheduled to be the final race of the 2001 season, but Loudon was moved to the weekend after due to 9/11. That instead made this the second-to-last race of the season.
2002: Race shortened due to rain. Moved from November to October, such that the race will no longer be the final race of the NASCAR season.
2009: Race moved from October to Labor Day weekend, marking the first regularly scheduled NASCAR Cup Series race at Atlanta to start at night.  Kasey Kahne took the win, the second of the year for the team now under the aegis of Richard Petty Motorsports.
2011: Race postponed from Sunday night to Tuesday afternoon due to rain. Jeff Gordon scored his 85th career win after a fierce duel with teammate Jimmie Johnson over the final ten laps on worn tires, giving him sole possession of third on the all-time wins list and the most wins by a driver in NASCAR Modern Era (1972–present). This was only the second time in NASCAR's Modern Era that a race was postponed to a Tuesday, the other time coming in August 2007 at Michigan (also for rain). Gordon was honored by NASCAR president Mike Helton with a framed portrait of photos from past victories by Jeff made into the shape of the No. 85 to commemorate the milestone victory.
 2015: The start of the race was delayed nearly an hour due to rain. Once the race began there were two wrecks, one with 69 laps to go where two cars were involved, and another wreck with 21 laps to go. Six cars were involved in the second incident, which brought a nine-minute, one-second red flag to facilitate cleanup on the track. Jimmie Johnson scored his first win of the season.
 2016: Johnson repeated as race winner and tied Dale Earnhardt with 76 career Cup wins.  Matt Kenseth was black flagged on a green flag stop when a crewman left a wedge wrench on the rear deck and another crewman picked it up for use on the car; a communication breakdown meant Kenseth stayed on the racetrack for five laps and was not scored for one of those laps.
 2017: 2500th Monster Energy NASCAR Cup Series race. Kevin Harvick led 292 of the 325 laps and looked to be on his way to his second win at Atlanta until a caution came out for Austin Dillon's stalled car. When they came down pit road under caution, Harvick got caught speeding exiting sending him to the rear of the field. Kyle Larson found himself on his way to the win, until with seven laps to go left the door open as if he were oblivious, allowing Brad Keselowski to pass him and ultimately win. It was also the first time the stage racing format was used at Atlanta, where stages 1 and 2 were 85 laps long each, and stage 3 comprising the final 155 laps of the event. Last race on the original pavement laid down when the track was reconfigured in 1997, but voices from fans and drivers are calling for them not to repave the surface, even though several drivers saw tires fail during the race.
 2022: The 2022 race marked the first event to be held on the track after it was repaved and reprofiled with steeper turns and a narrower racing surface, with a new rules package to emulate superspeedway racing like that seen at Daytona and Talladega. The event ended up setting a new track record for lead changes, with 46 lead changes among 20 leaders. William Byron took his third career Cup victory after dominating the closing portion of the race.

References

External links
 

1960 establishments in Georgia (U.S. state)
 
NASCAR Cup Series races
Recurring sporting events established in 1960
Annual sporting events in the United States